Eurasian Astronomical Society (EAAS) is a scientific society, which comprises professional astronomers from the former Soviet republics, Europe, Israel and United States. It was founded in 1990. The governing bodies are placed in Moscow at the State Astronomical Institute named after P.K. Shternberg.

Founded by EAAS
 The International Astronomy Olympiad (since 1996)

See also
 Members of the Eurasian Astronomical Society
 List of astronomical societies

External links
 Eurasian Astronomical Society
 List of the members from Western Europe, Israel and the United States

Astronomy organizations
Organizations established in 1990